Ratanji Dadabhoy Tata (1856–1926) was an Indian businessman who played a pivotal role in the growth of the Tata Group in India. He was the first cousin of Jamsetji Tata, a pioneering industrialist and the founder of Tata Sons. He was one of the partners in Tata Sons founded by Jamsetji Tata. Ratanji is the father of J. R. D. Tata.

Personal life

Ratanji was born in Navsari in Gujarat in 1856. He studied at The Cathedral & John Connon School and Elphinstone College in Bombay. After graduating, he took up a course in agriculture in Madras. He then joined his family trade in the Far East.

Ratanji was married to a Parsee girl at a tender age. However, she died childless not long after the marriage. Ratanji was in his forties when he remarried a French woman, Suzanne Brière, in 1902. This was considered revolutionary in his times and was not welcomed by some in the Parsi community. They had five children Rodabeh, Jehangir, Jimmy, Sylla and Dorab.

Opium trade

Under the name Tata & Co, Ratanji ran an opium importing business in China, which was legal at the time. In 1887, he and other merchants such as David Solomon Sassoon presented a petition on behalf of the opium traders to complain about a Hong Kong Legislative Council bill that threatened to affect their trade.

Director of Tata Steel

Tata Steel was conceived and commissioned by Jamsetji Tata. However, Jamsetji died before the completion of the project. Ratanji played an important role in the completion of the Tata Steel Project along with Jamsetji's son Dorab and thus Tata Steel was established in Jamshedpur.

The Tatas supplied steel to the British during the First World War. However, after the war Tata Steel went through a difficult period in the 1920s as steel was dumped into India from Britain and Belgium. Ratanji, along with other directors successfully sought protection for the Indian steel industry from the colonial government of the day and steadied the operations of Tata Steel.

References

 A section of the Tata family tree from the Tata Central Archives

Ratanji Dadabhoy
Parsi people
Businesspeople from Gujarat
1856 births
1926 deaths
Members of the Imperial Legislative Council of India
Tata Group people
Indian emigrants to France